Kaahumanu Church is a Church in Wailuku, Maui, Hawaii. Upon visiting a religious service in Wailuku in 1832 by Jonathan Smith Green, Queen Ka'ahumanu requested that a more permanent church structure be named for her, but her request was not honored until 1876 when the current structure was built by Edward Bailey. Sunday services are held in the church, with the hymns and invocation invoked in the Hawaiian language.

Inception
Upon arrival to the islands, American missionaries usually held religious services out in the open; this was later superseded by the building of thatched grassed hales, and then lumber built structures, sometimes imported from New England. The utilization of local materials became more prevalent over time 

In 1832, Queen Ka'ahumanu, an early convert into Christianity, visited Maui, and came to the site of the then new Ka'ahumanu Church, witnessing services being presided by Jonathan Smith Green. Upon seeing this, Queen Ka'ahumanu asked the Congregationalist mission to name the permanent church structure after her.

First, second, and third Buildings
The first building used by Jonathan Smith Green for his services was nothing more than a simple shed; it was built on land owned by Kahale family granted under King Kamehameha III.

In 1834, due to the ballooning congregation numbers (3000 worshipers was noted at one point) a second building was built, which was a thatched structure. However, despite the large worship numbers, the actual permanent membership of the church was small; an 1834-1835 report noted eleven members of the church. 

During the "Great Revival" between 1837–1840, the church membership ballooned to 487; the 1838-1839 year alone saw 200 new members into the church. With this swell in membership, a new third church structure was built under the supervision of Richard Armstrong after Jonathan Smith Green left in 1836. However, problems with the roof was noted by Jonathan Smith Green after his return in 1841 to replace Richard Armstrong. Deemed a "failure" by Jonathan Smith Green, the roof was fixed after a $648.28 expenditure.

William Patterson Alexander was installed at the church in 1857 after pastor Daniel Conde was not liked by the congregation and a petition to have him removed was circulated. Alexander noted that a new church was needed, and advocated building a new one as early as 1866. It wasn't until 1872 that fund-raising efforts were undertaken by William Pulepule Kahale, the first Native Hawaiian Pastor in the church, to build a new structure.

Current building
The current structure, the fourth on the site, was built in 1876. It was built to honor Queen Ka'ahumanu's earlier request by Wailuku Sugar Company manager Edward Bailey. It is built in the New England simple style Gothic Architecture.

The bell and three clock faces are from the Seth-Thomas clock works, and brought over in 1884 around the Cape Horn. The apparatus was donated by the Bailey family at a cost of $1000.00. Chandeliers were added in 1892. Maui County officials designated the clock in Ka'ahumanu Church as the "Town Clock" in 1964.

Grounds
A stone structure to the rear of the building with one opening exists. This was once used as a bell tower before the current one was constructed. Parts of the original structure of the previous third church is a rock retaining wall fronting the church alongside High Street. Several graves also mark the site. An auxiliary building sits between the church and the Territorial Building in the Wailuku Civic Center Historic District

Honoli'i, noted as being one of the first Native Hawaiians to be educated in New England and returning on the sailing ship Thaddeus, is buried in the cemetery.

Gallery

Today
Services are held every Sunday. The hymns and invocations are done in the Hawaiian language, which echo the legacy of Hawaiian churches being stalwarts in the survival of the Hawaiian language where it was banned from being spoken in public.

Historic listings
The site was placed on the National Register of Historic Places on May 12, 1975 and the Hawaii State Register of Historic Places on May 18, 1981.

Notes

Bibliography

External links

Churches completed in 1876
19th-century Protestant churches
Religious buildings and structures in Maui County, Hawaii
Churches in Hawaii
Churches on the National Register of Historic Places in Hawaii
Historic American Buildings Survey in Hawaii
1832 establishments in Hawaii
National Register of Historic Places in Maui County, Hawaii
Hawaii Register of Historic Places